Transport in Lagos currently consists of four modes: road, water, rail and air.

Roads

Aiports

Railways

Lagos Rail Mass Transit is a system being developed and under construction in Lagos, Nigeria. The system (the first modern rail-based public transport in Sub-Saharan Africa outside of South Africa) is being sponsored by the Lagos Metropolitan Area Transport Authority (LAMATA) and is envisioned to consist eventually of seven lines. The railway equipment including electric power, signalling, rolling stock, and fare collection equipment will be provided by the private sector under a Concession Contract. LAMATA is responsible for policy direction, regulation, and infrastructure for the network.

The concessionaire will generate its own dedicated electricity. The first section of the network (Phase I of the Blue Line) was scheduled to enter revenue service by the first quarter of 2014, but had not yet opened as of September 2014, amid delays.

Timeline 
 2008: A metro is proposed for Lagos, allegedly with a completion date of 2011.
 2009: Construction commences on the Blue Line.
 2010: Lagos Rail Mass Transit to proceed.
 2016: Phase I (the Blue Line from Marina to Mile 2) planned to open in December 2016.
 2018: After an Alstom review of the project, Phase I (the Blue Line from Marina to Mile 2) is now set to open in 2021.
 2021: The Lagos State Government announced that the Blue and Red Lines will open in December 2022.
 2022, January: LAMATA purchases two Talgo VIII trains.

History
The Lagos tramway ran from 1902 to 1933. The passenger line was one of the earliest public transport system built within Lagos, carrying travelers, traders and workers from the train station at Iddo going to Lagos Island.

The idea of developing rapid transit in Lagos dates from the 1980s with the Lagos Metroline network conceived by the Alhaji Lateef Jakande during the Second Nigerian Republic. The initial Metroline project was scrapped in 1985 by Muhammadu Buhari at a loss of over $78 million to the Lagos tax payers. The idea of developing a light rail network for Lagos was revived by Governor Bola Tinubu in the early 2000s with a formal announcement of its construction in December 2003.

This initial $135 million proposal was part of the greater Lagos Urban Transportation Project to be implemented by the newly formed Lagos Metropolitan Area Transport Authority (LAMATA). LAMATA initially concentrated on developing a Bus Rapid Transit system, running from Mile 12 to Lagos Island. In 2008, LAMATA began also to make progress with the rail project, focusing initially on the Blue Line and the Red Line.

Rolling stock
In September 2011, LAMATA announced that it would acquire some H5-series subway trains formerly used by the Toronto Transit Commission (TTC). The cars are being refurbished in the United States and converted to standard gauge before being imported and put into service on the Blue and Red lines. The same contract also included an option for some H6-series subway cars from the TTC, however this has since been cancelled. The trains were built as two-unit married pairs with a driver's cab in the front right corner of each car.

Routes

Okokomaiko-Marina Blue Line
In April 2008, the Lagos State Government approved ₦ 70 billion for construction of the Okokomaiko-Iddo-Marina Line, with an estimated completion date of 2011. Advisory services are being provided by CPCS Transcom Limited, an Infrastructure Development consulting firm based in Ottawa, Canada. Construction actually commenced in January 2010, and completion is now expected in 2015.

The Blue Line is now being built by China Civil Engineering Construction Corporation. The Blue Line will run 27.5 km from Marina to Okokomaiko, with 13 stations. End-to-end journey time will be approximately 35 minutes. It is being built as a high capacity, electrically powered rail mass transit system. Most of the route will be on the surface, running east-west, in the central reservation of the rebuilt Badagry Expressway between Igbo-Elerin Road (Okokomaiko) and Iganmu.

The line will run on elevated structure from Iganmu along the south side of the expressway passing the junction with Eric Moore Road, crossing just south of the National Theatre to Iddo, then south to Lagos Island with a terminal at Marina. Construction is underway between National Theatre and Mile 2. A Maintenance and Storage Facility (MSF) will be constructed at Okokomaiko, with a track connection from the Blue Line to the depot.

The entire Blue Line will operate over a secure and exclusive right-of-way, with no level crossings and no uncontrolled access by pedestrians or vehicles. Lagos State is financing construction of the Blue Line from its own resources. A concession contract is being awarded to finance, supply and operate the railway equipment, including electric power, signalling, trains, and fare collection.

Agbado-Marina Red Line
The second line, the Red Line, will run from Marina to Agbado. The line will share the existing 30 metre wide Nigerian Railway Corporation (NRC) right-of-way.

Other lines
LAMATA has long term plans to build up to seven lines.

Bus terminals 

 Ikeja Bus Terminal, Ikeja
 Mafoluku Bus Terminal, Ikeja
 Oshodi Bus Terminal, Oshodi
 Oyingbo Bus Terminal, Lagos Mainland
 Yaba Bus Terminal, Lagos Mainland
 TBS Bus Terminus, Lagos Island

See also
Transportation in Nigeria
LAMATA
Rapid transit

References

Further reading

External links
LAMATA Rail Services official site
Lagos State Waterways Authority  official site

Subways.net Lagos Rail Mass Transit